The Rzhev Memorial to the Soviet Soldier is a Russian memorial park located in the Rzhevsky District of the Tver Oblast. The park is dedicated to the Battles of Rzhev.

Overview

History

The idea to build the memorial came from veterans of the war who collectively wrote to the Committee of the Union State of Russia and Belarus and to scouts of the Russian Military Historical Society (RMHS) in 2017 asking them to create a monument in honor of the diamond jubilee of the victory. Andrei Korobtsov and Konstantin Fomin were the respective sculptor and architect for the project, both being chosen following an international competition that looked into the matter. The erection of the monument began in January 2020 and was completed by early May. Despite being completed in time for the anniversary celebrations on 9 May, it was decided, in light of the COVID-19 pandemic, that the opening date would be pushed a month later. It was opened in a public ceremony on 30 June attended by Russian President Vladimir Putin, Belarusian President Alexander Lukashenko and Red Army veterans of the Second World War.

Monument

The monument features a bronze 25-metre statue of a soldier in the Red Army standing on a 10-metre mound. On the road leading to the mound, there are images of soldiers on broken walls situated on both sides, as well as the names of those who were killed in action during the battle. Around 34 million rubles were allocated to the monument from the regional government, alongside the 650 million rubles allocated by the Union States, the budget of the Russian government, and private donations. The construction of the monument was also financed and supported by organizations such as Lukoil.
The image of a soldier dissolving in a flock of birds originates from the poem Zhuravli by Rasul Gamzatov, which became iconic thanks to its adaptation to music by Yan Frenkel.
"I sometimes feel that the soldiersWho have not returned from the bloody fieldsNever lay down to earth But turned into white cranes..."

References

External links

Parks in Russia
World War II memorials in Russia
Geography of Tver Oblast
Tourist attractions in Tver Oblast
Soviet military memorials and cemeteries
Monuments and memorials in Russia